The Ministry of Communications (reporting name: MoCom), is a Cabinet-level ministry of the Pakistani Government responsible for analysing, formulating and implementing central policy on communications and transportation. It is one of the oldest ministries, created on 14 August 1947. The Ministry of Communications has jurisdiction over telegraph and telephone communications as well as public radio, technical means of radio and television broadcasting and the distribution of periodicals. The Ministry and its political executive, the Communications Minister, are headquartered in the Cabinet Secretariat, Islamabad Capital Venue. The Communications Minister is a public appointee who must be a member of Parliament.

History
When the Ministry was created in 1947, Sardar Abdur Rab Nishtar was appointed as the first Communications Minister. The Communications Ministry was merged in 1971–72 with the Ministry of Hajj. In 1974 the Ministry of Hajj again became a separate Ministry, and the new Ministry of Communications and Railways was formed. Railways broke off in later years, became a Division of the Communications Ministry from 2002–03 and then separated again. In 2004 the Ports and Shipping Wing became an independent Division of the Ministry.

Functions
The Communications Ministry performs a wide array of functions.  These include promoting international competitiveness of exports, integrating remote areas of the country into the national economy, ensuring safe and smooth travel on national roads, providing an efficient, reliable and speedy postal service comparable to private alternatives, researching road engineering, building and management, and expanding national road networks.  The Ministry also works to increase the standard of its own operations through prioritising development projects and operational activities according to national needs, providing support to the economy, improving project monitoring and implementation, improving the quality of human resources, using incentives and discipline to enhance good governance, and improving values and ethics.

Organisation

National Highway Authority

The National Highway Authority is responsible for building and maintaining highways and motorways in Pakistan. The objective of the NHA is to "plan, promote and organize programmes for construction, development, operation, repairs & maintenance of National Highways, Motorways & strategic roads.

National Highways & Motorway Police

National Highways & Motorway Police (NH&MP) is a police force in Pakistan that is responsible for enforcement of traffic and safety laws, security and recovery on Pakistan's National Highways and Motorway network.

National Transport Research Centre
National Transport Research Centre (NTRC) was established in June 1974 in the Planning and Development Division as one of its Technical Sections to provide much-needed research and development (R&D) support for planning and appraisal of transport sector projects/plans in a coordinated and cost-effective manner. NTRC was transferred as such to the Communications Division in November 1992. It is effectively functioning as an R&D Wing of the Ministry of Communications.

Construction Machinery Training Institute
Construction Machinery Training Centre (CMTC) was established in May 1986 with the assistance of the Government of Japan through Japan International Cooperation Agency (JICA). The centre, having successfully met the aims and objectives, was upgraded in 1992 and renamed as Construction Machinery Training Institute.

Postal Division

Pakistan Post

Pakistan Post is a state enterprise dedicated to providing a wide range of postal products and public services in Pakistan. It is the largest postal service in the country.

Pakistan Post Foundation
Pakistan Post Foundation (PPF) was established in 1990 as a trust to generate resources and promote the social well-being present and retired postal employees through commercial ventures.

Allocation of business
The Federal Government has allocated the following business to the ministry under Schedule II, Rules of Business 1973:
 National planning, research and international aspects of road and road transport 
 National highways and strategic roads, including administration of the National Highway Council and Authority, Central Road Fund and Fund for Roads of National Importance. 
 Mechanically propelled vehicles, through the Transport Advisory Council and Urban Road Transport Corporation
 Enemy property
 National Highways & Motorway Police

List of Communications Ministers of Pakistan

External links 
 Website

References

Communications

Communications in Pakistan
Pakistan
Pakistan